A constitutional referendum was held in Italy on 7 October 2001. The amendment was supported by the Silvio Berlusconi government. Voters were asked whether they approved of amending the constitution to give more powers to the regions on issues including agriculture, education, healthcare and taxation. The proposals were approved by 64.2% of voters.

The resulting Constitutional changes are subject of conflicting opinions regarding the practical success of the amendment; in its most evident outcome, the text of Article 117 of the Constitution was inverted: whereas the original text listed the areas where the Regions had legislative authority, where the Regions and the State had shared authority, and leaving any other subject matter in the hands of the State, the new version of this article lists a series of subjects as areas of legislative authority of the State, with others having shared authority and anything that isn't specifically mentioned being included in the legislative authority of the Regions. 
This solution, typical of Federated States, was applied to Italy (a Regional State) with marginal effective results, due to a series of contributing factors that, in practice, reduced the Regions' ability to legislate to almost the same level as before the constitutional reform.

Results

References

2001 referendums
2001 elections in Italy
Constitutional referendums in Italy
October 2001 events in Europe